Eudalaca ammon is a species of moth of the family Hepialidae. It is known from South Africa, Zimbabwe and the Democratic Republic of Congo.

References

External links
Hepialidae genera

Hepialidae
Lepidoptera of the Democratic Republic of the Congo
Lepidoptera of Zimbabwe
Lepidoptera of South Africa
Moths of Sub-Saharan Africa
Moths described in 1860